Spring Creek is an unincorporated community in Madison County, North Carolina, United States.  Located along NC 209, north of Trust and Luck, the community was named after Spring Creek, which is adjacent to the highway.  The community is part of the Asheville Metropolitan Statistical Area.

References

Unincorporated communities in Madison County, North Carolina
Unincorporated communities in North Carolina